Khairil Azam bin Pilus (born 15 November 1985), better known by his stage name Aril, is a Malaysian singer, actor, dancer and TV host, also known by his stage name of Aril. Aril is the younger brother of late fellow artist Izwan Pilus.

Career
Aril had hosted some tv program long before he drafted to AF. It was when he little bit known as Ajam Pilus. Later he appeared in Gangstarz 2007 (vocal group talent search) as member of First Edition. He also featured in Xpose- the program had broadcast in Astro Prima about current trend. Aril was interviewed in episode that revealing the rising trend of shuffle dance of that period.

Akademi Fantasia
Aril joined and became 1st runner-up of the seventh season of Akademi Fantasia, receiving 22% percent of over 4.2 million votes although he was eliminated on the 7th week of the competition, but he was voted back-in by the competition by 'AFMASUK' of the voters, and won the 2nd place in the season 7 final round in May 2009.

Actor & host
Aril is also an actor, starring alongside another seventh season, student, Akim and past fifth season winner, Mila Jirin in TV show called Kau dan Aku.

He also has a lead role in telemovie call Shuffle Milikku which recently premiered in Astro.

Aril is also the new TV host for Trek Selebriti.

In his singing career, he recently has two released singles: Toksik  and Menatap Matamu.  Along with show alums Mawi, Mila, Stacy, Hafiz, Akim, Isma and Yazid, Pilus now has his "chart-topping songs" released in a compilation album by Era FM.

Songs performed on Akademi Fantasia

Filmography

TV Series

Telemovie

Television

Hardstyle Republic
Aril is known as 'Ajam' the Gambler in the Melbourne Shuffle group 'Hardstyle Republic'. Outside of Malaysian showbiz, he has his own shuffling scene fan-base who are international followers from YouTube.

References
References

External links

1985 births
Living people
People from Kuala Lumpur
21st-century Malaysian male singers
Malaysian television personalities
Malay-language singers
Akademi Fantasia participants